The Espolin Gallery is an art gallery in Storvågan near Kabelvåg in the municipality of Vågan, Norway.

The gallery was established in 1992 to display the works of the artist Kaare Espolin Johnson. In addition to Espolin Johnson's works, the gallery also displays works by other artists. The gallery is now part of the SKREI Heritage Center (SKREI Opplevelsessenter) at Museum Nord.

Architecture
The building was designed by the architect Gisle Jakhelln. He took his inspiration from traditional Icelandic construction because Espolin Johnson had Icelandic ancestors. The gallery received financial support for the expansion from the Arts Council Norway, Nordland County Council, the municipality of Vågan, and the bank Sparebanken Nord-Norge.

References

External links
The Espolin Gallery at the Museum Nord website
The Espolins Gallery website

Art museums and galleries in Norway
Culture in Nordland
Vågan
Art museums established in 1992